The Narwhal is a Canadian investigative online magazine that focuses on environmental issues.

Organization 
It was launched by Carol Linnitt and Emma Gilchrist in May in 2018 as a spin-out of their previous work with DeSmog Canada and is a not-for-profit organization funded by membership subscriptions and is a member of the Institute for Nonprofit News.  

Gilchrist is the Editor-in-Chief/Executive Director; Linnitt is the Executive Editor; Mike De Souza is the Managing Editor; the Ontario Bureau Chief is Denise Balkissoon; and Amber Bracken is a regular contracted photojournalist.

Activities 
Amber Bracken, on assignment for The Narwhal, was arrested alongside CBC commissioned journalist Michael Toledano while reporting on the 2020 Canadian pipeline and railway protests. The Narwhal was noted for their support of Bracken, in the context of her being an independent contractor. 

In 2021, The Narwhal journalist Sarah Cox won a Press Freedom Award for her reporting on the Site C hydroelectric project. Despite the small size of the organization, The Narwhal has won many awards.

References 

Environmental magazines
Newspapers published in Toronto
Publications established in 2018
2018 establishments in Ontario
Magazine publishing companies
Magazine publishing companies of Canada